USS Groton (PF-29), a , was the first ship of the United States Navy to be named for Groton, Connecticut.

Construction
Groton (PF-29), formerly classified as PG-137, was launched under Maritime Commission contract by Walter Butler Shipbuilding Company, Inc., in Superior, Wisconsin, on 14 September 1943, sponsored by Mrs. Percy Palmer; and commissioned on 5 September 1944.

Service history

United States
After shakedown training off Bermuda, Groton reported for Atlantic duty on 30 October 1944. She departed for her first duty station on 2 November, arriving in NS Argentia, Newfoundland, three days later.  The ship sailed on 6 November for her weather station in the north Atlantic, sending important reports to allied weather stations and helping to guide wartime traffic safely to Europe.  Groton remained on this duty, based at Argentia, until sailing for Boston, Massachusetts, on 7 February 1945.  She had but a short respite, and was back on her weather station 10 days later.

Groton performed weather picket duty in the Atlantic until 15 November 1945 when she returned to Boston for transfer to the United States Coast Guard.  The ship simultaneously decommissioned from the United States Navy and commissioned in the Coast Guard on 13 March 1946.  Serving the Coast Guard on loan, Groton again was assigned to weather duty off Argentia until decommissioning on 25 September at New Orleans, Louisiana.

After being moved to Lake Charles, Louisiana, in November, Groton returned to New Orleans in January 1947. Turned over to the State Department for disposal, she was sold to the Government of Colombia on 26 March 1947, where she served as in the Colombian Navy as ARC Almirante Padilla (FG 11).

Colombia

Almirante Padilla joined the multi-national United Nations forces during the Korean War. After refitting in San Diego, and a joint U.S.-Colombian exercise at Pearl Harbor, Almirante Padilla joined the 7th Fleet's Task Force 95 on 8 May 1951, and was assigned to patrol duties on the west coast of Korea. Padilla was transferred to the east coast on 14 June to patrol close inshore off Wonsan, and later was assigned the coast south of Songjin. Almirante Padillas tour of duty ended on 19 January 1952, when she sailed to Yokosuka, where she was relieved by her sister ship ARC Capitan Tono.

Almirante Padilla was disposed of in 1965.

References 

 Gardiner, Robert and Stephen Chumbley. Conway's All the World's Fighting Ships 1947–1995. Annapolis, Maryland USA: Naval Institute Press, 1995. .

External links 
 
 hazegray.org: USS Groton

Tacoma-class frigates
Ships built in Superior, Wisconsin
1943 ships
World War II frigates and destroyer escorts of the United States
Cold War frigates and destroyer escorts of the United States
Korean War frigates and destroyer escorts of the United States
Tacoma-class frigates of the Colombian Navy
Korean War frigates of Colombia